JECRC University is a private university located in the city of Jaipur, in Rajasthan in India. It is recognized by the University Grants Commission (UGC), New Delhi.

Courses offered
JECRC University offers Bachelor's and Master's degrees.

See also
List of institutions of higher education in Rajasthan

References

External links
Official website

Private universities in India
Engineering colleges in Jaipur
Universities and colleges in Jaipur
Universities in Rajasthan
Educational institutions established in 2012
2012 establishments in Rajasthan